József Bajza (31 January 1804 – 3 March 1858) was a Hungarian poet and critic.

He was born at Szücsi and was first published in Károly Kisfaludy's Aurora, a literary paper he edited from 1830 to 1837. He also contributed substantially to the Kritikai Lapok, the Athenaeum, and the Figyelmező (Observer). His reviews of dramatic art were considered the best of these miscellaneous writings. In 1830 he published translations of some foreign dramas, Ausländische Bühne, and in 1835 a collection of his own poems. In 1837 he was made director of the newly established national theatre at Pest. He then, for some years, devoted himself to historical writing, and published in succession the Historical Library (Történeti Könyvtár), 6 vols., 1843–1845; the Modern Plutarch (Uj Plutarch), 1845–1847; and the Universal History (Világtörténet), 1847. These works are partly translations from German authors. In 1847 Bajza edited the journal of the opposition, Ellenor, at Leipzig, and in March 1848 Lajos Kossuth made him editor of his paper, Kossuth Hirlapja. In 1850 he fell ill with a brain disease, and he died in Pest in 1858.

References
 

1804 births
1858 deaths
Hungarian male poets
Members of the Hungarian Academy of Sciences
19th-century Hungarian poets
19th-century Hungarian male writers